Sidi Bel Abbès is one of the provinces (wilayas) of Algeria. Its name is derived from the name of its capital, the city of Sidi Bel Abbès. It is situated in the northwestern part of the country.

History
The province was created from Oran (department) in 1974. In 1984, Aïn Témouchent Province was carved out of its territory.

Administrative divisions
The province is divided into 15 districts (daïras), which are further divided into 52 communes or municipalities.

Districts

 Aïn El Berd
 Ben Badis
 Marhoum
 Mérine
 Mostefa Ben Brahim
 Moulay Slissen
 Ras El Ma
 Sfisef
 Sidi Ali Benyoub
 Sidi Ali Boussidi
 Sidi Bel Abbès
 Sidi Lahcène
 Télagh
 Ténira
 Téssala

Communes

 Aïn Adden
 Aïn El Berd
 Aïn Kada
 Aïn Thrid
 Aïn Tindamine
 Amarnas
 Badredine El Mokrani
 Belarbi
 Ben Badis
 Benachiba Chelia
 Bir El Hammam
 Boudjebaa El Bordj
 Boukhanafis
 Chettouane Belaila
 Dhaya
 El Hacaiba
 Hassi Dahou
 Hassi Zehana
 Lamtar
 Makedra
 Marhoum
 M'Cid
 Merine
 Mezaourou
 Mostefa Ben Brahim
 Moulay Slissen
 Oued Sebaa
 Oued Sefioun
 Oued Taourira
 Ras El Ma
 Redjem Demouche
 Sehala Thaoura
 Sfissef
 Sidi Ali Benyoub
 Sidi Ali Boussidi
 Sidi Bel Abbès
 Sidi Brahim
 Sidi Chaib
 Sidi Dahou el Zairs
 Sidi Hamadouche
 Sidi Khaled
 Sidi Lahcene
 Sidi Yacoub
 Tabya (Tabla)
 Tafissour
 Taoudmout
 Teghalimet
 Telagh
 Tenezara
 Tenira
 Tessala
 Tilmouni
 Zerouala

References

External links

 

 
Provinces of Algeria
States and territories established in 1974